Ognjen Ožegović (born 9 June 1994) is a Serbian professional footballer who plays as a striker for Super League Greece club Volos.

Club career
Born in Gradiška, Ožegović made his first football steps with the local club Kozara and later he moved to Borac Banja Luka. Subsequently, Ožegović went through the youth setup at Red Star Belgrade, where captained a team for a period. He was initially sent out on loan to Banat Zrenjanin (2012), and then to Voždovac (2013), in order to gain experience. In early 2014, Ožegović terminated his contract with Red Star. He subsequently signed a six-month deal with Rad, helping them avoid relegation from the top flight in the 2013–14 campaign.

In the 2014–15 season, Ožegović played for Jagodina (fall) and Borac Čačak (spring). He scored six times for the latter side, including a long-range volley in a 3–1 win over his former club Jagodina, securing him the Goal of the Season award. In July 2015, Ožegović signed a three-year contract with Vojvodina. He netted seven league goals for the side, including a bicycle kick in a 2–0 win against Javor Ivanjica that earned him the Goal of the Season award for the second time in a row. He also scored a twice in the first leg of the third qualifying round for UEFA Europa League, in 4–0 away victory over Sampdoria.

In early 2016, Ožegović moved abroad to China and joined Super League club Changchun Yatai. He failed to score in nine games for the side, before returning to Serbia.

On 31 August 2016, Ožegović signed a one-year contract with Čukarički. He scored a total of 16 goals in 25 league appearances over the course of the 2016-17 season. In addition to the regular season, Ožegović was prolific in Čukarički's 2016–17 Serbian Cup campaign, scoring in the second round against Javor and in the second leg of the semi-final against Red Star Belgrade.

Partizan
On 31 August 2017, Ožegović joined Partizan. He signed a three-year contract and was given the number 51 shirt. He made his debut for the club on 9 September 2017, against Mladost Lučani. He scored his first goal for Partizan on 17 September 2017 against Radnički Niš in a 3–1 home league victory.

On 28 September 2017, he recorded his first European goals after found the back of the net in a 2–3 home loss to Dynamo Kyiv in 2017–18 UEFA Europa League group stage second match. He also scored goal in 2–1 home victory over Young Boys, on 26 November, as Partizan advanced to the knockout stage after 13 years.

On 14 April 2018, Ožegović scored his first goal in Eternal Derby, converting a penalty kick in a 2–1 defeat.

Arsenal Tula (loan)
On 4 September 2018, he joined Russian Premier League club FC Arsenal Tula on loan.

Partizan return
Ožegović returned to Partizan for the 2019–20 season. He scored his first Super Liga goal on 4 August 2019, in a 4–0 win over Mačva.

Darmstadt 98
On 2 September 2019, Ožegović joined Darmstadt 98 on a two-year deal. In July 2020, after making just five appearances as a substitute, he agreed the termination of his contract.

Manisa
On 20 January 2022, Ožegović signed a 1.5-year contract with Manisa.

Volos
Ožegović made his debut for the team on September 11 2022 at the Karaiskakis Stadium against Olympiacos, scoring a goal in the 29th minute after an assist from Paolo Fernandes. A week later, in the fifth round of the Super League Greece, Ožegović scored his second goal for Volos against Ionikos.

International career
Ožegović made his official debut for the Serbia U17s at the 2011 UEFA European Under-17 Championship. He subsequently represented Serbia at the 2013 UEFA European Under-19 Championship, as the team won the tournament. Four years later, Ožegović was named in the final 23-man squad for the 2017 UEFA European Under-21 Championship.

In September 2016, Ožegović appeared in Serbia's friendly match against Qatar.

Controversy
In an interview for mondo.rs in summer 2017, he said that his dream was to win a title with Red Star and celebrate it in front of the north stand with Delije. He also said that his dream did not come truth because of club policy at time, which, in his words, favoured "players from Ghana and Uganda over Red Star children." When he became a potential transfer target of Partizan in late August that summer, many Partizan supporters were against their club signing him. Finally, Ožegović signed with Partizan on last day of the summer transfer window. During the official promotion at new club, sports director Ivica Iliev revealed that Ožegović started playing football with Partizan. Several days later in interview for Sportski žurnal, Ožegović explained that he spent three months training with the club at the age of 13.

Personal life
Ožegović is religious Orthodox Christian. He was born as the only child in the family. His father, Marinko, is a retired footballer who played as a goalkeeper for Borac Banja Luka and Rudar Velenje.

Career statistics

Club

International

Honours
Red Star Belgrade
 Serbian Cup: 2011–12

Partizan
Serbian Cup: 2017–18

Serbia
 UEFA Under-19 Championship: 2013

References

External links
 
 
 
 

1994 births
People from Gradiška, Bosnia and Herzegovina
Serbs of Bosnia and Herzegovina
Living people
Members of the Serbian Orthodox Church
Serbian footballers
Serbia youth international footballers
Serbia under-21 international footballers
Serbia international footballers
Association football forwards
Red Star Belgrade footballers
FK Banat Zrenjanin players
FK Voždovac players
FK Rad players
FK Jagodina players
FK Borac Čačak players
FK Vojvodina players
Changchun Yatai F.C. players
FK Čukarički players
FK Partizan players
FC Arsenal Tula players
SV Darmstadt 98 players
Adanaspor footballers
Manisa FK footballers
Volos N.F.C. players
Serbian SuperLiga players
Serbian First League players
Chinese Super League players
Russian Premier League players
2. Bundesliga players
TFF First League players
Super League Greece players
Serbian expatriate footballers
Expatriate footballers in China
Expatriate footballers in Russia
Expatriate footballers in Germany
Expatriate footballers in Turkey
Expatriate footballers in Greece
Serbian expatriate sportspeople in China
Serbian expatriate sportspeople in Russia
Serbian expatriate sportspeople in Germany
Serbian expatriate sportspeople in Turkey
Serbian expatriate sportspeople in Greece